Novi Pazar is a village in Chernoochene Municipality, in Kardzhali Province, in southern-central Bulgaria. As of 2007 it had a population of 190 people.

References

Villages in Kardzhali Province